Dignāga (a.k.a. Diṅnāga, c. 480 – c. 540 CE) was an Indian Buddhist scholar and one of the Buddhist founders of Indian logic (hetu vidyā). Dignāga's work laid the groundwork for the development of deductive logic in India and created the first system of Buddhist logic and epistemology (Pramana). 

According to Georges B. Dreyfus, his philosophical school brought about an Indian "epistemological turn" and became the "standard formulation of Buddhist logic and epistemology in India and Tibet." Dignāga's thought influenced later Buddhist philosophers like Dharmakirti and also Hindu thinkers of the Nyaya school. Dignāga's epistemology accepted only "perception" (pratyaksa) and "inference" (anumāṇa) as valid instruments of knowledge and introduced the widely influential theory of "exclusion" (apoha) to explain linguistic meaning. His work on language, inferential reasoning and perception were also widely influential among later Indian philosophers. According to Richard P. Hayes "some familiarity with Dinnaga's arguments and conclusions is indispensable for anyone who wishes to understand the historical development of Indian thought."

Dignāga was born in Simhavakta near Kanchipuram and very little is known of his early years, except that he took Nagadatta of the Pudgalavada school as his spiritual preceptor, before being expelled and becoming a student of Vasubandhu.

Philosophy

Dignāga mature philosophy is expounded in his magnum opus, the Pramāṇa-samuccaya. In chapter one, Dignāga explains his epistemology which holds that there are only two 'instruments of knowledge' or 'valid cognitions' (pramāṇa); "perception" or "sensation" (pratyakṣa) and "inference" or "reasoning" (anumāṇa). In chapter one, Dignāga writes:

Sensation and reasoning are the only two means of acquiring knowledge, because two attributes are knowable; there is no knowable object other than the peculiar and the general attribute. I shall show that sensation has the peculiar attribute as its subject matter, while reasoning has the general attribute as its subject matter.

Perception is a non-conceptual knowing of particulars which is bound by causality, while inference is reasonable, linguistic and conceptual. This conservative epistemic theory was in contrast to the Nyaya school who accepted other means of knowledge such as upamāṇa (comparison and analogy).

Pratyakṣa 
Pratyakṣa is a kind of awareness that acquires information about particulars, and is immediately present to one of the senses. This is the topic of the first chapter of the Pramāṇa-samuccaya. For Dignāga, perception is pre-verbal, pre-conceptual and unstructured sense data. In chapter two of the Pramāṇa-samuccaya he writes:

Sensation is devoid of structure. That cognition in which there is no structure is sensation. What kind of thing is this so-called structure? Attaching a name, a universal and so forth.

According to Dignāga our mind always takes raw sense data or particulars and interprets them or groups them together in more complex ways, compares them to past experiences, gives them names to classify them based on general attributes (samanyalaksana) and so forth. This process he terms kalpana (arranging, structuring). This cognitive process is already different from sensation, which is a simple cognition based only on the immediately present. Thus pratyakṣa is only awareness of particular sense data such as a patch of green color and the sensation of hardness, never awareness of a macroscopic object such an apple which is always a higher level synthesis. For Dignāga, sensation is also inerrant, it cannot "stray" because it is the most basic and simple phenomenon of experience or as he puts it:

"it is impossible too for the object of awareness itself to be errant, for errancy is only the content of misinterpretation by the mind."

Also, for Dignaga, pratyakṣa is mostly phenomenalist and is not dependent on the existence of an external world. It is also inexpressible and private.

Anumāṇa 
Anumāṇa (inference or reasoning) for Dignāga is a type of cognition which is only aware of general attributes, and is constructed out of simpler sensations. Inference can also be communicated through linguistic conventions. 

A central issue which concerned Dignāga was the interpretation of signs (linga) or the evidence (hetu) which led one to an inference about states of affairs; such as how smoke can lead one to infer that there is a fire. This topic of svārthānumāna (reasoning, literally "inference for oneself") is the subject of chapter two of the Pramāṇa-samuccaya while the topic of the third chapter is about demonstration (parārthānumāna, literally "inference for others"), that is, how one communicates one's inferences through proper argument. 

According to Richard Hayes, in Dignāga's system, to obtain knowledge that a property (the "inferable property", sadhya) is inherent in a "subject of inference" (paksa) it must be derived through an inferential sign (linga). For this to occur, the following must be true: 

The inferential sign must be a  property of the subject of the inference. That is, there exists in the subject of inference a property, which is different from the inferable property and which is furthermore evident to the person drawing the inference; this second property may serve as an inferential sign in case it has two further characteristics.
The inferential sign must be known to occur in at least one locus, other than the subject of inference, in which the inferable property occurs.
The inferential sign must not be known to occur in any other loci in which the inferable property is absent.

Richard Hayes interprets these criteria as overly strict and this is because he sees Dignāga's system as one of rational skepticism. Dignāga's epistemology, argues Hayes, is a way to express and practice the traditional Buddhist injunction to not become attached to views and opinions. According to Hayes, for Dignāga, the role of logic is:

to counter dogmatism and prejudice. As a weapon in the battle against prejudice that rages in every mind that seeks wisdom--in minds of the vast majority of people who do not seek wisdom, prejudice simply takes full control without a contest-there is nothing as powerful as the kind of reason that lies at the heart of Dignaga's system of logic. For it should be clear that very few of our judgments in ordinary life pass the standards set by the three characteristics of legitimate' evidence. Taken in its strictest interpretation, none of the judgments of any but a  fully omniscient being passes. And, since there is no evidence that there exist any fully omniscient beings, the best available working hypothesis is that no one's thinking is immune from errors that require revision in the face of newly discovered realities.

Apohavada and language
Dignāga considered the interpretation of conventional and symbolic signs such as the words and sentences of human language to be no more than special or conventional instances of the general principles of inference or anumana. He takes up several issues relating to language and its relationship to inference in the fifth chapter of his Pramāṇa-samuccaya.   

During Dignāga's time, the orthodox Indian Nyaya school and also Hindu Sanskrit grammarians (such as Bhartṛhari) had discussed issues of epistemology and language respectively, but their theories generally accepted the concept of universals which was rejected by most Buddhist philosophers. Influenced by the work of these thinkers as well as by Buddhist philosophers of the Sautrantika school who rejected Hindu theories of universals in favor of nominalism (prajñapti), Dignāga developed his own Buddhist theory of language and meaning based on the concept of "apoha" (exclusion). Hattori Masaaki explains the doctrine thus: 

a word indicates an object merely through the exclusion of other objects (anyapoha, -vyavrtti). For example, the word "cow" simply means that the object is not a non-cow. As such, a word cannot denote anything real, whether it be an individual (vyakti), a universal (jati), or any other thing. The apprehension of an object by means of the exclusion of other objects is nothing but an inference.

Works
As noted by Hayes, the difficulty in studying the highly terse works of Dignāga is considerable, because none of them have survived in the original Sanskrit and the Tibetan and Chinese translations which do survive show signs of having been done by translators who were not completely certain of the meaning of the work. This difficulty has also led scholars to read Dignaga through the lens of later authors such as Dharmakirti and their Indian and Tibetan interpreters as well as their Hindu Nyaya opponents. Because of this tendency in scholarship, ideas which are actually innovations of Dharmakirti and later authors have often been associated with Dignaga by scholars such as Fyodor Shcherbatskoy and S. Mookerjee, even though these thinkers often differ.  

Dignāga's magnum opus, the Pramāṇa-samuccaya (Compendium of Valid Cognition), examined perception, language and inferential reasoning. It presents perception as a bare cognition, devoid of conceptualization and sees language as useful fictions created through a process of exclusion (Apoha).

Other works include:
Hetucakra (The wheel of reason), considered his first work on formal logic. It may be regarded as a bridge between the older doctrine of trairūpya and Dignāga's own later theory of vyapti which is a concept related to the Western notion of implication.

Alambana-parīkṣā, (The Treatise on the Objects of Cognition) and its auto commentary (vrtti).

Abhidharmakośa-marma-pradīpa – a condensed summary of Vasubandhu's seminal work the Abhidharmakosha
A summary of the Mahayana Aṣṭasāhasrika-prajñāpāramitā sūtra

Trikāla-parikṣa, (Treatise on the tri-temporality)

Nyāya-mukha (Introduction to logic).

Tradition and influence
Dignāga founded a tradition of Buddhist epistemology and reasoning, and this school is sometimes called the "School of Dignāga" or "The school of Dinnāga and Dharmakīrti" (due to the strong influence of Dharmakīrti as well). In Tibetan it is often called “those who follow reasoning” (Tibetan: rigs pa rjes su ‘brang ba); in modern literature it is sometimes known by the Sanskrit 'pramāṇavāda', often translated as "the Epistemological School." Many of the figures in these were commentators on the works of Dinnāga and Dharmakīrti, but some of them also wrote original works and developed the tradition in new directions.

The work of this tradition also went on to influence the Buddhist Madhyamaka school, through the work of figures like Bhāvaviveka (c. 500 - c. 578), Jñanagarbha (700-760), and Śāntarakṣita (725–788). These thinkers attempted to adopt the logical and epistemological insights of Dinnāga and Dharmakīrti to defend the tenets of the Madhyamaka school.

Dignāga's tradition of logic and epistemology continued in Tibet, where it was expanded by thinkers such as Cha-ba (1182–1251) and Sakya Pandita (1182–1251).

Dignāga also influenced non-Buddhist Sanskrit thinkers. According to Lawrence J. McCrea, and Parimal G. Patil, Dignāga set in motion an "epistemic turn" in Indian philosophy. After Dignāga, most Indian philosophers were now expected to defend their views by using a fully developed epistemological theory (which they also had to defend).

See also
 Buddhist logic
 Critical Buddhism

References

Further reading
 Chu, Junjie (2006).On Dignāga's theory of the object of cognition as presented in PS (V) 1, Journal of the International Association of Buddhist Studies 29 (2), 211–254
 Frauwallner, Erich, Dignāga, sein Werk und seine Entwicklung. (Wiener Zeitschrift für die Kunde Süd- und Ostasiens 2:83–164, 1959)
 Hattori Masaaki, Dignāga, On Perception, being the Pratyakṣapariccheda of Dignāga's Pramāṇasamuccaya from the Sanskrit fragments and the Tibetan Versions (Cambridge, Mass.: Harvard University Press, 1968)
 Hayes, Richard, Dignāga on the Interpretation of Signs (Dordrecht: Reidel Publishing Company, 1982)
 Katsura Shoryu, Dignāga and Dharmakīrti on apoha in E. Steinkellner (ed.), Studies in the Buddhist Epistemological Tradition (Vienna, Österreichische Akademie der Wissenschaften, 1991), pp. 129–146
 Mookerjee, S. The Buddhist Philosophy of Universal Flux, an Exposition of the Philosophy of Critical Realism as expounded by the School of Dignāga (Calcutta, 1935)
 Sastri, N. Aiyaswami, Diṅnāga's Ālambanaparīkṣā and Vṛtti. Restored with the commentary of Dharmapāla into Sanskrit from the Tibetan and Chinese versions and edited with English translations and notes with extracts from Vinītadeva's commentary. (Madras: The Adyar Library. 1942)
 Tucci, Giuseppe, The Nyāyamukha of Dignāga, the oldest Buddhist Text on Logic after Chinese and Tibetan Materials (Materialien zur Kunde des Buddhismus, 15 Heft, Heidelberg, 1930)
 Vidyabhusana, S.C. A History of Indian Logic – Ancient, Mediaeval and Modern Schools (Calcutta, 1921)

External links
Dignaga's Logic of Invention, by Volker Peckhaus
Vidhabhusana, Satis Chandra (1907). History of the Mediaeval School of Indian Logic. Calcutta University.

Atomists
6th-century Indian philosophers
Buddhism amongst Tamils
Buddhist logic
Buddhist writers
Idealists
Indian Buddhist monks
Indian logicians
Indian scholars of Buddhism
Yogacara
Year of birth uncertain
5th-century Indian philosophers
6th-century Indian mathematicians
5th-century Indian mathematicians
6th-century Indian writers